Bridge of Serves is a bridge in Guimarães, Portugal, crossing the Ave River. The bridge was classified as a National Monument in 1938. Construction probably started in 1185; the structure underwent reinforcement works in 1950 that left it completely changed from its medieval origins. It features four uneven arches, with cutwaters in the pillars.

See also
List of bridges in Portugal

References

Serves
National monuments in Braga District
Bridges over the Ave River